Bernathonomus is a genus of moths in the family Erebidae.

Species
Bernathonomus aureopuncta
Bernathonomus minuta
Bernathonomus ovuliger
Bernathonomus piperita
Bernathonomus postrosea
Bernathonomus punktata

References

External links
Natural History Museum Lepidoptera generic names catalog

Phaegopterina
Heteroneura genera